Most of the rivers of West Bengal originate from the Himalayan in the north or from the Chhota Nagpur plateau in the west and flow south or southeast over the state. Due to the rivers in the western plains, the water is very scarce or bare at any other time of the year, especially in the fall of the Falgun-Chaitra, except during the monsoon.
List of rivers of West Bengal state, located in Eastern India.

Lists of rivers in Bengal
The major rivers of West Bengal state of India include:

 Adi Ganga
 Ajay River.....
 Anjana River
 Atrai River
 Bakreshwar River
 Balason River
 Baleshwar River
 Bansloi River
 Barakar River
 Bhagirathi River
 Banka River
 Behula River
 Bhairab River
 Bidyadhari River
 Brahmani River (Birbhum)
 kanchan River Maharaja Hat
 Choita river
 Churni River
 Damodar River
 Dharla River
 Dud Kumar River
 Dwarakeswar River
 Dwarka River
 Gandheswari River
 Ganga River
 Ghargharia River
 Ghiya River
 Gosaba River
 Haldi River
 Hariabhanga River
 Hinglo River
 Hooghly River
 Ichamati River
 Jalangi River
 Jaldhaka River
 Jamuna River
 Kalindi River
 Kangsabati River
 Kaljani River
 kapaleswari River
 Karatoya River
 Keleghai River
 Ketha River
 Khari River
 Khong Khola
 Kopai River
 Kosai River
 Kulik River-Raigang
 Kunur River
 Kunti River
 Mahananda River
 Matla River
 Mathabhanga River
 Mayurakshi River
 Mechi River
 Mundeswari River
 Muri Ganga River
 Piyali River
 Punarbhaba River
 Raidāk River
 Raimangal River
 Rangeet River
 Rasulpur River
 Rupnarayan River
 Sali River (West Bengal)
 Sankosh River
 Saptamukhi River
 Saraswati River (Bengal)
 Shil Torsa River
 Shilabati River
 Singimari River
 Subarnarekha River
 Talma River
 Tangon River
 Teesta River
 Thakuran River
 Torsha River

Rivers of the Sundarbans

 Piyali River
 Murrigonga River
 Thakhuran River
 Matala River
 Goshaba River
 Harrivnga River
 Saptamukhi River
 Jamira River
 Raimangal River
 Bidyadhari River
 Kalnagini River

See also
 
 
 List of Rivers of Nadia

 
West Bengal
Rivers